Nannu Dochukunduvate is a 2018 Telugu romance film directed by R. S. Naidu and starring Sudheer Babu and Nabha Natesh. The film is Nabha's debut. The music was composed by B. Ajaneesh Loknath. It's dubbed in Hindi as Pyaar Ki Jeet.

Synopsis
Karthik (Sudheer Babu) is a workaholic working in a software company. He dreams of immigrating to the US. A situation forces him to hire a short film actress Meghana/Siri (Nabha Natesh) to act as his lover, Meghana is playful and full of life, unlike Karthik who leads a boring life. After a few incidents Meghana proposes to Karthik through WhatsApp that he does not notice due to his work pressure and she deletes the message. Suddenly Karthik's father gets sick and he asks Meghana and Karithik to attend a wedding in which accidentally they got close and Karithik starts to love her. After the wedding he wants to propose, but he heard Meghana promising to her mother that she will marry whoever her mother will choose in her favorite temple. Karithik feels sad and leaves. To their surprise Karithik 's father knew that they were not a real couple and her name. They were both separated. On Meghana 's wedding day Karithik hurries to her wedding, but they learn that it was only an act. The actor leaves the act and Karithik replaces him as the movie ends.

Cast
Sudheer Babu as Karthik
Nabha Natesh as Meghana / Siri, software engineer
Nassar as Karthik's father
Rajsekhar Aningi
Viva Harsha as Harsha
Chalapathi Rao
Jeeva as College Principal
Babloo Prithiveeraj as David
Varshini Sounderajan as Sathya
Sudharshan
Prabhas Sreenu as Daivatailam, hotel manager
Venu Tillu as Giri
Tulasi as Meghana's mother
Tarzan as Baasha Bhai
Ravi Varma
Rajasree Nair
Shanmukh Jaswanth Kandregula as Rohan
Ravi Siva Teja

Soundtrack
The Music was composed by B. Ajaneesh Loknath and Released by Sony Music India.

Reception
Times of India rated the film as "a passable laugh-a-minute riot" with good performances from the lead pair, while The Hindu wrote that, "the writer-director translates the script into a film, reasonably fun outing".

References

External links
 

2018 romance films
Indian romance films
2010s Telugu-language films